Rocannon's World is a science fiction novel by American writer Ursula K. Le Guin, her literary debut. It was published in 1966 as an Ace Double, along with Avram Davidson's The Kar-Chee Reign, following the tête-bêche format. Though it is one of Le Guin's many works set in the universe of the technological Hainish Cycle, the story itself has many elements of heroic fantasy. The hero Gaveral Rocannon encounters lords who live in castles and wield swords, and other races much like fairies and gnomes, in his travels on a backward planet.

The word "ansible" for a faster-than-light communicator, was coined in the novel.  The term has since been widely used in science fiction.

Plot summary

Semley's story 

The novel begins with a prologue called "Semley's Necklace", which was first published as a stand-alone story titled "The Dowry of Angyar" in Amazing Stories (September 1964). A young woman named Semley takes a space voyage from her unnamed, technologically primitive planet to a museum to reclaim a family heirloom.

The interstellar League of All Worlds has placed an automated spaceship at the disposal of the more advanced underground dwellers of the planet. Semley descends into their tunnels, uses the spaceship for the flight and returns after sixteen years. Due to relativistic time dilation while the trip will be of short duration for her, many years will elapse on her planet. She returns to find her daughter grown up and her husband dead.

Rocannon's story 
The novel then follows Gaverel Rocannon, an ethnologist who had met Semley at the museum. He later goes on an ethnological mission to her planet, Fomalhaut II.  It was through Rocannon's efforts that the planet had been placed under an 'exploration embargo' in order to protect the native cultures.  Unbeknown to him and his colleagues, there is a base on the planet of an enemy of the League of All Worlds—a young world named Faraday, which embarked on a career of interstellar war and conquest, and which chose this "primitive" world as the location of a secret base. After the enemy destroys his ship and his companions, Rocannon sets out to find their base so that he can alert the League of their presence with the enemy's ansible.

However, with his advanced means of transport destroyed, he must use other means of travel, such as on the back of "windsteeds", basically large flying cats, as well as by boat or walking.  His long and dangerous quest, undertaken with loyal companions from the Angyar, a local feudal culture, takes him through many lands, encountering various other cultures and species and facing numerous threats having nothing to do with the one he intends to confront.  He identifies five species of highly intelligent life forms (hilfs), the dwarfish Gdemiar, the elven Fiia, the rodent-like Kiemhrir, the nightmarish Winged Ones, and the most human species, the Liuar. Increasingly, as the plot progresses, his experiences impact his personality and make him more attuned to the planet's culture and changes him from the interstellar sophisticate he had been.  He encounters an entity in a mountainside cave and in exchange for "giving himself to the planet", he receives the gift of Mindspeech, a form of telepathy.

Finally, after traveling halfway across the globe, and suffering much loss and bereavement, he reaches the enemy's stronghold which had been set up in a heretofore unknown land occupied by far distant relatives of the Angyar in whose strongholds in the northern continent his journey  had begun.

Rocannon reverts from the effective role of a Bronze Age hero, into which he had been increasingly pushed during most of the book, back to being the resourceful operative of an interstellar civilization. He uses his mindspeech abilities to both plan and successfully infiltrate the enemy base where he uses an ansible in one of the parked ships to alert his people. A Faster-Than-Light (FTL) unmanned ship (as life cannot survive FTL travel in the Hainish universe) destroys the installation following Rocannon's escape. Being telepathic, Rocannon feels the hundreds of deaths which he had caused at the moment when they happen — and while recognizing the need to have taken this action, he feels deeply guilty and is further traumatized, in effect burned out and incapable of ever initiating any further action.

After the completion of his quest, Rocannon retires with the Angyar of the south continent, surrounded by sympathetic people and with a loving woman at his side. When rescuers from the League finally arrive nine years later, restricted to relativistic travel below light speed, they find that he has died without knowing that the planet was to be named after him.

Literary significance and criticism 
Rocannon's World along with its two sequels combine emerging British New Wave science fiction sentiments with established American genre imagery and Le Guin's signature anthropological interests into a tale of loss, companionship, isolation, redemption and love.

One science fiction scholar points out that Rocannon's World, along with Planet of Exile and City of Illusions exhibits Le Guin's struggle as an emerging writer to arrive at a plausible, uniquely memorable and straightforward locale for her stories.  The tropes in Rocannon's World adhere closely to those of high fantasy,  with Clayfolk resembling Dwarves and the Fiia resembling Elves, especially in their dialogue.  Additionally, Rocannon's World is noted to be a lightly disguised fantasy in which the legendary characters are easily interpreted by the readers as characters from the real world's future.

Robert Silverberg described the novel as "superior space opera, good vivid fun ... short, briskly told, inventive and literate."

Publication history
Rocannon's World was initially published with no introduction, but Le Guin wrote an introduction for Harper & Row's 1977 hardcover edition.  Rocannon's World was also issued in a 1978 book club omnibus along with Planet of Exile and City of Illusions in a volume called Three Hainish Novels and in a 1996 volume with the same novels titled Worlds of Exile and Illusion.

References

Sources

External links 
 

1966 American novels
1966 science fiction novels
Fiction set around Fomalhaut
Hainish Cycle
Debut science fiction novels
Planetary romances
Ace Books books
Novels by Ursula K. Le Guin
American science fiction novels
Heroic fantasy
1966 debut novels